The Ninanu  were an Aboriginal Australian people of the Gascoyne region of Western Australia.

Country
Their eastern boundary lay at the eastern end of Teano Range, while their southern frontier was in proximity of Mount Augustus.

Social customs
The Ninanu's initiatory rites involved the practice of both circumcision and subincision.

Alternative name
One possible alternative name for the Ninanu may be Ngaunmardi. The word is attested only in manuscripts collecting ethnographic data written by Carl Georg von Brandenstein, which state that this referred to a people on Dooley Downs on the Lyons River. Unable to find independent corroboration for this tribe, Tindale speculated that it might have been an alternative name for the Ninanu in the same area.

Notes

Citations

Sources

Aboriginal peoples of Western Australia
Gascoyne